{{DISPLAYTITLE:C19H22N2O3S}}
The molecular formula C19H22N2O3S (molar mass: 358.46 g/mol, exact mass: 358.1351 u) may refer to:

 Dimethoxanate
 MS-245